Indonesian Idol Season Six is a continuation of the Indonesian Idol show in the year 2010. Indonesian Idol came back after a suspension in the year  2009. What is different in this season is the judge of this event is no longer Titi DJ and Indra, who was replaced by Erwin Gutawa and Agnes Monica. Formation of the judge changed to four persons, namely Erwin Gutawa who acts as chairman of the judge, Agnes Monica, Anang Hermansyah, and a guest judge. For the position of the host, remains entrusted to Daniel Mananta which will guide the event this year alone. This season, Indonesian Idol theme is "Be A Superstar". This is the last season where there is a male winner

Starring

Host
 Daniel Mananta : MTV'S VJ, Presenter, & Actor

Judges
 Erwin Gutawa (Ketua Juri) : Composer
 Agnes Monica : Singer, Actress
 Anang Hermansyah : Composer & Singer

Guest Judges :
 Rossa : Singer
 Melly Goeslaw : Composer & Singer
 Ahmad Dhani : Producer, Composer & Singer
 Pasha : Band Vocalist
 Charly : Band Vocalist & Composer

Contributor
 Pasto : Vocal Coach
 Catharina Leimena : Vocal Coach
 Eki Dance Company : Choreographer (Workshop Round)
 Johan Jafar : Choreographer (Spectacular Show - Grand Final)
 Tommy Siawira (Star Harvest Academy) : Public Speaking Class
 Romy : Psychology class (Spectacular Show - Grand Final)

Band
 Magenta Five : Workshop Round
 Oni & Friends : Spectacular Show - Grand Final

Sponsor
 IM3
 Clear
 Indomie

Audition Schedule

Special Hunt
November–December 2009:
 Denpasar
 Palembang
 Makassar
 Manado
 Banjarmasin
 Ambon

Mini Auditions (Using the bus)
 Cirebon 1–4 December 2009
 Tegal 4–7 December 2009
 Semarang 7–10 December 2009
 Solo 10–13 December 2009
 Madiun 13–16 December 2009
 Malang 16–19 December 2009

Large Auditions
 Surabaya Kodam Balai Prajurit, December 21–23, 2009
 Medan Griya Dome, January 16–17, 2010
 Yogyakarta Jogja Expo Center (JEC), January 26–27, 2010
 Bandung Sasana Budaya Ganesha (SABUGA), February 1–2, 2010
 Jakarta Mega Glodok Kemayoran, February 15–18, 2010
 Contestants must be aged 16–27 years at the November 16, 2009 and lived in Indonesia.

Workshop Participants

Female Participants
 Ica - Raizza Intifada, June 30, 1990 (Surabaya)
 Diana - Diana Tuwema, June 19, 1985 (Jakarta)
 Keyko - Keyko Vredhe, April 11, 1989 (Medan)
 Dea - Panendra Larasati, January 18, 1991 (Bandung)
 Mona - Monalisa Lengkong, March 24, 1989 (Manado)
 Tesa - Atresye Novliana Tessa, November 12, 1986 (Surabaya), eliminated April 30
 Zulfa - Zulfa Tisa Shafira, January 15, 1992 (Surabaya), eliminated April 23
 Citra - Skolastika Citra Kirana Wulan, June 5, 1993 (Yogyakarta), eliminated April 16
 QZ - Putri Bilqis Anhudyanti, June 2, 1991 (Bandung), eliminated April 9
 Orin - Corina Reviera, July 30, 1991 (Medan), eliminated April 9
 Mela - Yunita Romela, June 8, 1988 (Palembang), eliminated April 2
 Doremi - Hairani Armaya Doremi, September 30, 1989 (Medan), eliminated April 2

Male Participants
 Fendi - Fendi, March 7, 1991 (Makassar)
 Ray - Ray Generies Tambunan, July 12, 1985 (Medan)
 Windra - Windra E., October 18, 1986 (Medan)
 Igo - Elicohen C. Pentury, February 19, 1993 (Ambon)
 Gilang - Gilang Saputra, September 7, 1991 (Yogyakarta)
 Rio - Rio Rezky Basir, May 6, 1988 (Makassar), Eliminated April 30
 Michael - Michael C. R. Dotulong, June 3, 1985 (Jakarta), eliminated April 23
 Fauzan - Muhammad Fauzan Julian Razak, July 12, 1990 (Bandung), eliminated April 16
 Andi - Andi Subadja, October 12, 1984 (Bandung), eliminated April 9
 Eza - Dimas Riza Mustajab, April 10, 1984 (Jakarta), eliminated April 9
 Sanni - Sannie Legawanta, July 12, 1985 (Bandung), eliminated April 2
 Bagus - Bagus Gede Perdana Putra, April 14, 1991 (Bali), eliminated April 2

Workshop Round

Workshop 1 (April 2, 2010)

Workshop 2 (April 9, 2010)

Workshop 3 (April 16, 2010)

Workshop 4 (April 23, 2010)

Workshop 5 (April 30, 2010)

Wildcard Show
This system always used in Indonesian Idol before, except series 2, would choose eliminated contestants to perform again and some of them will go to spectacular round

Wildcard Contestants
8 of 14 eliminated contestants will perform in wildcard show to get 4 contestants to completed top 14 in the spectacular show.
Mela
Eza
Andi
Citra
Zulfa
Michael
Tesa
Rio
Two contestants that have going to Spectacular Show from the highest vote from viewers was Rio and Citra
Two contestants that have going to Spectacular Show from the Judge's Choice was Tesa and Andi

Spectacular Show

14 Contestants of Indonesian Idol 2010 :
 Andi Subagja : "Bento"
 Rio Basir : "Pemikat Hati"
 Mona Lengkong : "Mutiara Timur"
 Citra Kirana : "Eksotik Jazzy"
 Fendi : "Baby Face"
 Windra E : "Bintang Melayu"
 Gilang Saputra : "Wonder Boy"
 Ica Intifada : "Pop Princess"
 Igo Pentury : "Ambon Manise"
 Tesa Novliana : "Suara Emas"
 Diana Tumewa : "Lady Popera"
 Keyko Vredhe : "Pop Mellow"
 Ray Generies : "Gelegar Medan"
 Dea Larasati : "Mojang Rocker"

Spectacular #1 (May 14th, 2010)
First Spectacular this year place in Hall D2 Kemayoran Pekan Raya Jakarta

Spectacular #2 (May 21st, 2010)
Begin from Second Spectacular Show will attend in Ballroom Hall Central Park, Jakarta.

Mona, contestant from Manado, should be excluded outside the predictions of the judges. The reason Mona mentioned candidates Indonesian Idol 2010.

Spectacular #3 (May 28th, 2010)

Spectacular #4(June 4th, 2010)
From the top 10 onwards, the judges are eligible to exercise a veto power on one eliminated contestant at any given point of the competition and spare them from elimination for that particular week. This power can only be exercised once.

Spectacular #5 (June 12th, 2010)
Especially for this Spectacular, held on Saturday, June 12, 2010 for the June 11, 2010, will show the opening ceremony and opening match 2010 FIFA World Cup Group A match between South Africa and Mexico, where the official TV station RCTI become publishers. Spectacular 5 held on 17:30, due to be aired at 20:00 on 2010 FIFA World Cup Group B match between Argentina and Nigeria.

Spectacular #6 (June 18th, 2010)
Spectacular 6 held on 17:30, due to be aired at 20:00 on 2010 FIFA World Cup Group C match between Slovenia and the United States. Top 8 Contestants also sing duet with their partner

Spectacular #7 (June 25th, 2010)
Spectacular 7 held on 17:30, due to be aired at 20:00 on 2010 FIFA World Cup Group G match between Portugal and Brazil.

Spectacular #8 (July 2nd, 2010)
Spectacular 8 held on 17:30, due to be aired at 20:00 on 2010 FIFA World Cup Quarter-finals match between Netherlands and Brazil.

Spectacular #9 (July 9th, 2010)
Contestants will begin sing 2 songs every their performances

Spectacular #10 (July 16th, 2010)

Spectacular #11 (July 23rd, 2010)
Contestants will sing 2 songs: 1 song duet with their idol and 1 song solo performance

Grand Final - Result & Reunioun Show
Citra & Igo succeed to break two positions in the Grand Final of Indonesian Idol Season Six held on July 31, 2010, at 9:30pm in the Ballroom Hall of Central Park, Jakarta.

Two grand finalists will sing three different songs: 1 song judges' choice, 1 song as best performance, and a victory song of creation Anang Hermansyah titled "Kemenangan Cinta".

Elimination

1 On 2nd Spectacular Show, 2 contestants must voted off

2 Starting from Top 10, the judges might use Veto Rights which the judges could rescue the voted off contestants. Veto Rights can only be used one time only

3 5th Spectacular Show was postponed a day because the opening of 2010 World Cup on June 11, 2010

4 On 10th Spectacular Show, 2 contestants must be voted off

5 Judges use their Veto Rights to save Ray from elimination

6 Judges can't use Veto Rights to save their contestant

Theme, Guests & Mentor

Elimination chart

 On 2nd Spectacular Show, 2 contestants must voted off
 Starting from Top 10, the judgess is might to use Veto Rights which the judges could rescue the voted off contestants. Veto Rights can only be used one time only
 5th Spectacular Show postponed a day because the opening of 2010 FIFA World Cup on June 11, 2010
 On 10th Spectacular Show, 2 contestants must voted off
 Judges use their Veto Rights to save Ray from elimination

Awards and nominations

Panasonic Gobel Awards

See also
 Indonesian Idol
 Indonesian Idol (season 1)
 Indonesian Idol (season 2)
 Indonesian Idol (season 3)
 Indonesian Idol (season 4)
 Indonesian Idol (season 5)
 Indonesian Idol (season 7)
 2011 Panasonic Gobel Awards

External links
 Official Site 

Indonesian Idol
2010 Indonesian television seasons